The Tuykos is a river in Perm Krai, Russia, a right tributary of the Ruch, which in turn is a tributary of the Veslyana.

References 

Rivers of Perm Krai